Peter Baines may refer to:

 Peter Augustine Baines (1787–1843), English Benedictine
 Peter Baines (soccer) (1919–1997), Australian-born footballer
 Peter Baines (academic) (born 1941), Australian geophysicist